Gloria Nevarez is the second Commissioner of the Mountain West Conference (MW), having assumed that position from retiring MW commissioner.Craig Thompson on January 1, 2023. Before joining the MW, she had been the fourth full-time commissioner of the West Coast Conference (WCC). Nevarez is the first Hispanic American to become a Commissioner of an NCAA Division I Conference. Prior to her duties as WCC commissioner, Nevarez served as a senior level administrator at the Pac-12 Conference, University of Oklahoma, WCC, University of California, Berkeley, and San Jose State University.

Education 
A Bay Area native, Nevarez graduated from Santa Clara High School. Nevarez went on to attend the University of Massachusetts (UMass), where she was a scholarship student-athlete in basketball. Nevarez graduated from UMass (cum laude) with a B.S. in Sports Management. After completion of her career at UMass, Nevarez attended the University of California, Berkeley, Law where she graduated with a Juris Doctor.

Career 
Finishing the completion of her J.D. degree, Nevarez began a career at a law firm. After a brief time practicing law, Nevarez was hired as the first full-time Director of Compliance for athletics at San Jose State University. From there, Nevarez returned to her law school alma mater, joining the athletic program staff as the Assistant Athletics Director of Compliance and Legal Affairs, while also serving as the interim Senior Woman Administrator. Following that, Nevarez began a term as the Associate Commissioner and Senior Woman Administrator for the West Coast Conference for the next 5 years. In August 2007, Nevarez was named Senior Associate Athletics Director and Senior Woman Administrator at the University of Oklahoma.

In March 2010, Nevarez was named Senior Associate Commissioner and Senior Woman Administrator of the Pac-10 Conference, known since 2011 as the Pac-12 Conference. During her time at the Pac-12, Nevarez oversaw all sports and championships except football and was the leagues' point person for men's basketball. Additionally, Nevarez was instrumental in the Pac-12's expansion from ten institutions to twelve, the relocation of the men's basketball tournament in Las Vegas, and the women's basketball tournament in Seattle. She was the lead on various international trips to China and Australia taken by Pac-12 teams, notably, Nevarez was instrumental in assisting UCLA when three players were arrested in China for stealing.

In March 2018, the West Coast Conference Presidents' Council selected Nevarez as the fourth full-time Commissioner to serve the West Coast Conference.

In November 2022, the Mountain West Conference Board of Directors selected Nevarez as the new commissioner;  she officially assumed her duties on January 1, 2023.

Personal 
Nevarez is married to fellow University of California, Berkeley, Law graduate Richard Young. Additionally, Nevarez has served as an adjunct faculty member at the University of San Francisco teaching on topics in sports law. Her father is of Mexican descent and her mother is of mixed Filipina and Irish ancestry.

References 

Living people
American sportspeople of Mexican descent
Year of birth missing (living people)
Place of birth missing (living people)
UMass Minutewomen basketball players
Women sports executives and administrators
Mountain West Conference commissioners
West Coast Conference commissioners
UC Berkeley School of Law alumni
California lawyers
University of California, Berkeley staff
University of Oklahoma people